Alizeh Shah (Urdu: علیزہ شاہ; born 9 June 2000) is a Pakistani actress who appears in Urdu television.  She made her acting debut in 2016, with a supporting role Alina in Choti Si Zindagi. In 2018, Her performance as Palwasha in Ishq Tamasha earned her the Hum Award for Best Television Sensation. Shah get widely recognized after portraying the role of Dua in Ehd-e-Wafa (2019).

After that she has portraying the main roles in several serials Hoor Pari (2019), Jo Tu Chahey (2019), Mera Dil Mera Dushman (2020), Tanaa Banaa (2021)  and bebasi (2022).

Life and career
Shah first appeared on television when she was 6 years old, working in a commercial alongside Wasim Akram, and began her professional acting career in 2017. She initially had a short role in Tere Naal Love Ho Gaya, followed by the role as Alina in Hum TV's Choti Si Zindagi. She has since played the female lead in Hoor Pari and Jo Tu Chahey. Shah played the character of Tamana in the TV series Daldal and the role of Palwasha in drama serial Ishq Tamasha, for which she received a nomination for the Best Television Sensation Female award at the seventh Hum Awards. She had performed the role of Dua in the drama serial Ehd-e-Wafa. She was last seen as Maira in ARY Digital's Mera Dil Mera Dushman.

Criticism 
In May 2021, Alizeh ventured into singing with a Punjabi song titled Badnamiyan, alongside singer Sahir Ali Bagga. She faced backlash on social media for wearing a tank top in the music video, going against modest clothing norms in the country. In July 2021, she was again faced with criticism for wearing revealing attire at the Hum Style Awards.

Filmography

Film

Television

Taqdeer

Special appearance

Accolades

References

External links

Living people
2000 births
Pakistani Muslims
Pakistani television actresses
Muslim models
Actresses in Urdu cinema